Sébastien Bruzzese (born 1 March 1989) is a Belgian footballer who plays as a goalkeeper for Cercle Brugge.

Career
Born in Liège, Bruzzese began his career with R.F.C. de Liège, who was promoted to the Belgian Third Division team and made his first three prof games. He moved in July 2007 to the reserve squad from Anderlecht and in August 2008 promoted to first squad, where he didn't play any first team matches. In the next season (2008/09), he was second keeper for a short while. First keeper Daniel Zitka was injured and first substitute Silvio Proto was loaned out to Germinal Beerschot.

At the end of January 2010, Bruzzese moved to Gent as it was unlikely he would get a chance to play at Anderlecht, being fifth keeper behind Silvio Proto, Daniel Zitka, Davy Schollen and Michaël Cordier. In the same period, he played seven caps for the Belgium national under-19 football team.

Bruzzese is sometimes compared to former keeper Christian Piot. He also owes a lot to Jacky Munaron, who made his transfer from Anderlecht to AA Gent possible. Munaron is a former keeper himself of Club Luik and Anderlecht.

On 31 January 2011 Bruzzese and his teammate Christophe Lepoint were involved in a serious car accident. Allegedly, they were returning from a night-club and that Bruzzese had been drinking, but this has never been confirmed.

Following the 2011–12 season, Bruzzese moved to Zulte Waregem.

International
Bruzzese was born in Belgium and is of Italian descent. In 2007 and 2008, Bruzzese gained 7 caps for the Belgian under-19 team.

Honours
Club Brugge
 Belgian Super Cup: 2016

References

External links
 Player Profile on footgoal.net
 

1989 births
Living people
Belgian footballers
Belgium youth international footballers
Belgian people of Italian descent
Association football goalkeepers
RFC Liège players
R.S.C. Anderlecht players
K.A.A. Gent players
S.V. Zulte Waregem players
Club Brugge KV players
Sint-Truidense V.V. players
K.V. Kortrijk players
Cercle Brugge K.S.V. players
Belgian Pro League players
Footballers from Liège